The Saville Shoot-Out is an annual curling tournament, held in September at the Saville Community Sports Centre in Edmonton, Alberta. It is part of the women's tour since 2006 and is one of the first events of the year. The men's event was discontinued after 2015. It had been running since 2004.

Event names
2004: Shamrock Classic Bonspiel
2006: Saville Sports Centre Sept. Shoot-Out
2007: Boston Pizza September Shoot-Out
2008: Boston Pizza Shootout
2009: September Shoot-Out
2010-2011: The Shoot-Out
2012-2013: The Shoot-Out @ the Saville Centre
2014-2018: HDF Insurance Shoot-Out
2019: Booster Juice Shoot-Out
2021: Alberta Curling Series: Saville Shoot-Out
2022: Saville Shoot-Out

Past champions

Women

Men

References

External links
 Saville Sports Centre Home Page